Wooler is a surname. People with this surname include:

 Bob Wooler (1926-2002), Liverpool DJ associated with The Beatles
 Charles Wooler (1930–2017), Rhodesia cricketer
 John Wooler (born 1958), active within the English music industry
 Thomas Jonathan Wooler (1786-1853), British Radical

See also
 Wooller, a surname